The Georgia Swarm are a box lacrosse team in the East Division of the  National Lacrosse League. They have been playing at the 13,000-seat Gas South Arena in Duluth, Georgia since their 2016 season.

Originally formed as the 2002 expansion Montreal Express, the owners of the Minnesota Swarm purchased the inactive Express franchise from the NLL to create the Swarm in 2004. They played at the Xcel Energy Center in Saint Paul, Minnesota from 2004 until 2015. On May 22, 2015, team owner John Arlotta announced that the Xcel Energy Center, home of the Swarm, did not renew the contract for the team. Instead of negotiating for a new lease, the Swarm began looking for potential relocation sites and eventually chose the Atlanta metro area.

In 2017 the Swarm won the NLL championship title against the defending Saskatchewan Rush 2-0 in a best of three series.

Current roster

Head coaching history
Note: This list does not include coaches from the Minnesota Swarm.

Awards and honors 
Note: This list does not include awards from the Minnesota Swarm
Note: Mike Poulin's 2020 Teammate of the year award was a tie with Dan Dawson of the Toronto Rock.

All-time record

Playoff results

Draft history

NLL Entry Draft 
First Round Selections

2015: Lyle Thompson (1st overall), Chad Tutton (5th overall), Randy Staats (6th overall)
 2016: Bryan Cole (4th overall), Connor Sellars (10th overall) 
 2017: Zed Williams (4th overall)
 2018: Brendan Bomberry (7th overall), Adam Wiedemann (8th overall)
 2019: Kason Tarbell (11th overall), Ryan MacSpadyen (13th overall) 
 2020: Robert Hudson (6th overall), Jeff Henrick (8th overall), Ethan Walker (10th overall), Laine Hruska (13th overall)
 2021: Ryan Lanchbury (2nd overall)
 2022: Brett Dobson (11th overall), Brady Kearnan (20th overall)

References

External links
 Official Website

 
National Lacrosse League teams
Sports teams in Atlanta
Lacrosse clubs established in 2004
Minnesota Swarm
2015 establishments in Georgia (U.S. state)
Lacrosse teams in Georgia (U.S. state)
Lacrosse in Georgia (U.S. state)